The enzyme gallate decarboxylase catalyzes the chemical reaction

3,4,5-trihydroxybenzoate  pyrogallol + CO2

This enzyme belongs to the family of lyases, specifically the carboxy-lyases, which cleave carbon-carbon bonds.  The systematic name of this enzyme class is 3,4,5-trihydroxybenzoate carboxy-lyase (pyrogallol-forming). Other names in common use include gallic acid decarboxylase and gallate carboxy-lyase. This enzyme participates in benzoate degradation via CoA ligation.

References 

 

EC 4.1.1
Enzymes of unknown structure
Phenolic acids metabolism